Strictly Sinatra is a 2001 British drama film written and directed by Peter Capaldi and starring Ian Hart, Kelly Macdonald, and Brian Cox. The film was released in the United Kingdom by Universal Pictures.

Synopsis
A young Glaswegian-Italian lounge singer, Toni Cocozza (Ian Hart), has a passion for Frank Sinatra and the dream of becoming a famous musician. He grows weary of playing to elderly crowds in third-rate bars and decides to accept career help from mob enforcer Chisholm (Brian Cox) and his boss Connolly (Iain Cuthbertson) whose wife (Una McLean) has taken a liking to Toni. In exchange for assisting the organization with their illegal activities, Chisholm pays for new clothes for Toni and pressures the producer of a talent show to allow Toni to compete in the contest. Meanwhile, he tries to keep his ties with the mob secret from his friend and accompanist Bill (Alun Armstrong) and pretty cigarette girl Irene (Kelly Macdonald) for whom he has fallen. The trio form a modern-day Rat Pack with Irene as Shirley MacLaine. Eventually his luck runs out. While he is helping to rob a store, Toni misses a date with Irene and she and Bill discover that he is leading a double life. They beg him not to compete in the talent show as he will be forever indebted to Chisholm, but he goes anyway. He only places fifth and continues his career singing in lounges, but is deeply unhappy. One day while making a drug drop the drugs he is carrying are stolen by a street kid. Toni refuses to harm the street kid, thus making him a target for the mob hitmen. He performs one last time at a birthday bash for Connolly's wife, fully expecting to be killed after he finishes his number. Bill rescues him by creating a distraction, which gives him a chance to get away with Irene. Using assumed names, the two manage to evade the mobsters and escape to New York City.

Cast
Ian Hart as Toni Cocozza
Kelly Macdonald as Irene
Brian Cox as Chisolm
Alun Armstrong as Bill
Tommy Flanagan as Michaelangelo
Iain Cuthbertson as Connolly
Una McLean as Dainty
Jimmy Chisholm as Kenny
Jimmy Yuill as Rod Edmunds
Richard E. Grant as Himself
Jimmy Tarbuck as Himself
Stewart Ennis as Doorman
Paul Doonan as Nicol
Anne Lacey as Coat check girl
Alex Howden as Kojak
Douglas Eadie as Hard man
Jami Ferreira as Drowned rat
Brian McDermott as Youth In Supermarker
Alex McAvoy as Aldo
Pauline Lockhart as Big T assistant
Billy McColl as John, the watchman
Iain Fraser as Joe, the bartender
Calum Beaton as Boy on stairs
Lisa Stuart as Casino Girl
Actor Ian Bannen was due to appear, but he died in an accident near Loch Ness during a break in filming. The cast and crew issued the following statement: "We are devastated to hear of the death of Ian Bannen earlier today. Ian was a hugely talented actor, a consummate professional and a much loved colleague."

Critical reception
The film received less than stellar reviews from critics upon its release, despite the well-regarded cast. Filmcritic.com's Christopher Null wrote, "Aside from good singin' and the always engaging Kelly Macdonald (as a cigarette girl who becomes Cocozza's girlfriend), there's just not much movie here." The BBC's Jamie Russell shared similar sentiments: "Lacking the scope or ambition that a feature film deserves, this could have made a passable TV drama, but on the big screen it's simply pointless. Not even the talented cast, which includes Ian Hart in the lead and the ever-reliable Brian Cox as one of the main gangsters, can enliven proceedings."

References

External links
 IMDB Listing
 Focus Features

2001 films
Universal Pictures films
British drama films
Films directed by Peter Capaldi
2000s English-language films
2000s British films